Patelloida is a genus of sea snails or true limpets, marine gastropod molluscs in the subfamily Lottiinae of the family Lottiidae, one of the families of true limpets.

(This genus name should not be confused with the similar-sounding true limpet superfamily Patelloidea, which is also part of the Patellogastropoda).

Species 
Species within the genus Patelloida include according to the World Register of Marine Species (WoRMS) 

 Patelloida alticostata (Angas, 1865)
 Patelloida bellatula (Iredale, 1929)
 Patelloida chamorrorum Lindberg & Vermeij, 1985
 Patelloida conulus (Dunker, 1861)
 Patelloida corticata (Hutton, 1880)
 Patelloida cryptalirata (Macpherson, 1955)
 Patelloida exilis (Philippi, 1846)
 Patelloida garrettii (Pilsbry, 1891)
 Patelloida garuda Nakano & Aswan, 2008
 Patelloida heroldi (Dunker, 1861)
 Patelloida heteromorpha (Oliver, 1926)
 Patelloida inquilinus (Preston, 1913)
 Patelloida insignis (Menke, 1843)
 Patelloida latistrigata (Angas, 1865)
 Patelloida lentiginosa (Reeve, 1855)
 Patelloida lineata (Philippi, 1846)
 Patelloida mimula (Iredale, 1924)
 Patelloida mufria (Hedley, 1915)
 Patelloida nigrosulcata (Reeve, 1855)
 Patelloida orbicularis J.R.C. Quoy & J.P. Gaimard, 1834 
 Patelloida perconica (Preston, 1913)
 Patelloida pseudopygmaea Nakano & Aswan, 2008
 Patelloida pygmaea (Dunker, 1860)
 Patelloida rolani Christiaens, 1987
 Patelloida rugosa Quoy & Gaimard, 1834
 Patelloida ryukyuensis Nakano & Ozawa, 2005
 Patelloida saccharina  (Linnaeus, 1758)
 Patelloida saccharina lanx (Reeve, 1855)
 Patelloida saccharina saccharina (Linnaeus, 1758)
 Patelloida saccharina stella (Lesson, 1830 in 1826-32)
 Patelloida saccharinoides Habe & Kosuge, 1996
 Patelloida signata (Pilsbry, 1901)
 Patelloida squamosa J.R.C. Quoy & J.P. Gaimard, 1834 
 Patelloida stellaris J.R.C. Quoy & J.P. Gaimard, 1834 
 Patelloida striata (Quoy & Gaimard, 1834)
 Patelloida toloensis Christiaens, 1977
 Patelloida victoriana (Singleton, 1937)

Taxon inquirendum
 Patelloida victoriae (Gatliff & Gabriel, 1922) 

Species brought into synonymy
 Patelloida ceciliana (Powell, 1951): synonym of Scurria ceciliana (d'Orbigny, 1841)
 Patelloida conoidalis (Pease, 1868): synonym of Eoacmaea conoidalis (Pease, 1868)
 Patelloida conoidea Quoy & Gaimard, 1834: synonym of Notoacmea conoidea (Quoy & Gaimard, 1834)
 Patelloida corrodenda May, 1920: synonym of Notoacmea corrodenda (May, 1920) (original combination)
 Patelloida depicta Hinds, 1842: synonym of Tectura depicta (Hinds, 1842)
 Patelloida elongata Quoy & Gaimard, 1834: synonym of Notoacmea elongata (Quoy & Gaimard, 1834)
 Patelloida flammea Quoy & Gaimard, 1834: synonym of Notoacmea flammea (Quoy & Gaimard, 1834)
 Patelloida inconspicua (Gray, 1843): synonym of Radiacmea inconspicua (J.E. Gray, 1843)
 Patelloida javanica Nakano, Aswan & Ozawa, 2005: synonym of Eoacmaea javanica (Nakano, Aswan & Ozawa, 2005)
 Patelloida lampanicola Habe, 1944: synonym of Patelloida conulus (Dunker, 1861)
 Patelloida maraisi (Kilburn, 1977): synonym of Asteracmea maraisi (Kilburn, 1977) (superseded combination)
 Patelloida mayi May, 1923: synonym of Notoacmea mayi (May, 1923) (original combination)
 Patelloida perfestiva Faber, 2004: synonym of Eoacmaea perfestiva (Faber, 2004)
 Patelloida pileopsis Quoy & Gaimard, 1834: synonym of Notoacmea pileopsis (Quoy & Gaimard, 1834) (original combination)
 Patelloida profunda (Deshayes, 1863): synonym of Eoacmaea profunda (Deshayes, 1863)
 Patelloida punctata Quoy & Gaimard, 1834: synonym of Naccula punctata (Quoy & Gaimard, 1834)
 Patelloida pustulata (Helbling, 1779): synonym of Eoacmaea pustulata (Helbling, 1779)
 Patelloida septiformis Quoy & Gaimard, 1834: synonym of Lottia septiformis (Quoy & Gaimard, 1834) (original combination)
 Patelloida signatoides (Kuroda & Habe, 1971): synonym of Patelloida signata (Pilsbry, 1901)

References

 Quoy, J.R. & Gaimard, J.P. 1834. Voyage de Découvertes de l'Astrolabe exécuté par Ordre du Roi, Pendant les Années 1826-1829. Paris : J. Tastu Zoologie Vol. 3 366 pp. 
 Dall, W.H. 1871. On the Limpets; with special reference to the species of the west coast of America, and to a more natural classification of the group. American Journal of Conchology 6(3): 227-282 [254] [Proceedings of the Boston Society of Natural History, 14: 51
  Oliver, W.R.B. 1926. Australasian Patelloididae. Transactions and Proceedings of the New Zealand Institute 56: 547-582 
Powell A. W. B., New Zealand Mollusca, William Collins Publishers Ltd, Auckland, New Zealand 1979 :
 Ponder, W.F. & Creese, R.A. 1980. A revision of the Australian species of Notoacmea, Collisella and Patelloida (Mollusca: Gastropoda: Acmaeidae). Journal of the Malacological Society of Australia 4(4): 167-208 
 Kirkendale, L.A. & Meyer, C.P. 2004. Phylogeography of the Patelloida profunda group (Gastropoda: Lottiidae): diversification in a dispersal-driven marine system. Molecular Ecology 13: 2749–2762
 Nakano, T. & Ozawa, T. 2007. Worldwide phylogeography of limpets of the order Patellogastropoda: molecular, morphological and Palaeontological evidence. Journal of Molluscan Studies 73: 79–99
 Nakano, T. & Sasaki, T. 2011. Recent advances in molecular phylogeny, systematics and evolution of patellogastropod limpets. Journal of Molluscan Studies 77: 203–217

Lottiidae